Inasa may refer to:

Places
, a former town in Inasa District, Shizuoka Prefecture, Japan
, a former rural district in Shizuoka Prefecture, Japan
, a hill to the west of Nagasaki, Nagasaki Prefecture, Japan

Fictional Characters
, a character from Ushio and Tora
, a character from My Hero Academia

Japanese-language surnames
Japanese masculine given names